Seo Ki-Seog is a South Korean judge. He was appointed to the Justice of the Constitutional Court of Korea in 2013

Career 
1981: Judge, Southern Branch of Seoul District Court
1983: Judge, Seoul Civil District Court
1985': Judge, Chungmu Branch of Masan District Court
1987: Judge, Eastern Branch of Seoul District Court
1989: Judge, Seoul Criminal District Court
1991: Judge, Seoul High Court
March 1991 to April 1992: Visiting Scholar, Keio University, Japan
1994: Research Judge, Supreme Court
1998: Senior Judge, Incheon District Court
1999: Chief Constitution Research Officer, Constitutional Court of Korea
2002: Senior Judge, Seoul Administrative Court
2004: Senior Judge, Daejeon High Court
2005: Senior Judge, Seoul High Court
2010: Chief Senior Judge, Seoul High Court
2010: Chief Judge, Cheongju District Court
2012: Chief Judge, Suwon District Court
2013: Chief Judge, Seoul Central District Court
2013: Justice, Constitutional Court (term end in April 2019)

References 

South Korean judges
Justices of the Constitutional Court of Korea
Living people
1953 births
Seoul National University School of Law alumni